United Nations Security Council Resolution 160, adopted on October 7, 1960, after examining the application of the Federation of Nigeria for membership in the United Nations the Council recommended to the General Assembly that the Federation of Nigeria be admitted.

The resolution was adopted unanimously by all 11 members of the Council.

See also
List of United Nations Security Council Resolutions 101 to 200 (1953–1965)

References
Text of the Resolution at undocs.org

External links
 

 0160
History of Nigeria
Foreign relations of Nigeria
 0160
1960 in Nigeria
 0160
October 1960 events